Roepkiella rufidorsia is a moth in the family Cossidae. It is found in India (Sikkim).

References

Natural History Museum Lepidoptera generic names catalog

Cossinae